Anders Theil (born March 3, 1970) is a Danish football manager and former player. He is currently Director of Sport at FC Roskilde.

At BK Frem his contract was set to expire on June 30, 2011, but in July 2009 he left the club.

He then became assistant manager at FC Roskilde. When Roskilde-manager Carsten Broe was sacked at the end of the 2011–12 season, Theil was installed as caretaker manager. On 4 July 2012 he was given a more permanent contract. In June 2017 he was promoted and became Director of Sport at FC Roskilde. Following the departure of Morten Uddberg as manager in October 2020, Theil was made caretaker manager for the rest of 2020.

References

External links
 Boldklubben Frem profile

1970 births
Living people
Danish men's footballers
Association football goalkeepers
Boldklubben Frem players
Hvidovre IF players
KFUM Roskilde players
Kjøbenhavns Boldklub players
Køge Boldklub players
Danish football managers
Boldklubben Frem managers